Nikolai Matvejev (11 December 1923 – 5 April 1984) was a Soviet cyclist. He competed in the 4,000 metres team pursuit event at the 1952 Summer Olympics.

References

1923 births
1984 deaths
Estonian male cyclists
Soviet male cyclists
Olympic cyclists of the Soviet Union
Cyclists at the 1952 Summer Olympics
Sportspeople from Tallinn
Estonian people of Russian descent